Fresh Off the Boat is an American television sitcom broadcast on ABC created by Nahnatchka Khan. The story follows the course of Eddie Huang's Taiwanese family as they make their way from Washington, D.C. to Orlando, Florida to open up a steak restaurant. The series premiered on February 4, 2015. On May 7, 2015, the show was renewed by ABC for a second season. On March 3, 2016, ABC renewed the series for a third season, which premiered on October 11, 2016. On May 12, 2017, ABC renewed the series for a fourth season, which premiered on October 3, 2017. A fifth season premiered on October 5, 2018. On May 10, 2019, ABC renewed the series for a sixth season. The series concluded on February 21, 2020, after six seasons.

Series overview

Episodes

Season 1 (2015)

Season 2 (2015–16)

Season 3 (2016–17)

Season 4 (2017–18)

Season 5 (2018–19)

Season 6 (2019–20)

Ratings

Season 1 (2015)

Season 2 (2015–16)

Season 3 (2016–17)

Season 4 (2017–18)

Season 5 (2018–19)

Season 6 (2019–20)

Overall ratings

References

Fresh Off the Boat